Ahrensfelde Friedhof station, literally "Ahrensfelde Cemetery", is a railway station in the municipality of Ahrensfelde near the local cemetery, located in the Barnim district in Brandenburg, Germany. It is served by the Regionalbahn service RB 25 of the Niederbarnimer Eisenbahn.

References

Railway stations in Brandenburg
Buildings and structures in Barnim
Railway stations in Germany opened in 1908